In mathematics, Property B is a certain set theoretic property. Formally, given a finite set X, a collection C of subsets of X has Property B if we can partition X into two disjoint subsets Y and Z such that every set in C meets both Y and Z. 

The property gets its name from mathematician Felix Bernstein, who first introduced the property in 1908.

Property B is equivalent to 2-coloring the hypergraph described by the collection C. A hypergraph with property B is also called 2-colorable. Sometimes it is also called bipartite, by analogy to the bipartite graphs.
Property B is often studied for uniform hypergraphs (set systems in which all subsets of the system have the same cardinality) but it has also been considered in the non-uniform case.

The problem of checking whether a collection C has Property B is called the set splitting problem.

Smallest set-families without property B 

The smallest number of sets in a collection of sets of size n such that C does not have Property B is denoted by m(n).

Known values of m(n) 
It is known that m(1) = 1, m(2) = 3, and m(3) = 7 (as can by seen by the following examples); the value of m(4) = 23 (Östergård), although finding this result was the result of an exhaustive search. An upper bound of 23 (Seymour, Toft) and a lower bound of 21 (Manning) have been proven. At the time of this writing (March 2017), there is no OEIS entry for the sequence m(n) yet, due to the lack of terms known.

 m(1)
 For n = 1, set X = {1}, and C = {{1}}. Then C does not have Property B.

 m(2) 
 For n = 2, set X = {1, 2, 3} and C = {{1, 2}, {1, 3}, {2, 3}} (a triangle). Then C does not have Property B, so m(2) <= 3. However, C' = {{1, 2}, {1, 3}} does (set Y = {1} and Z = {2, 3}), so m(2) >= 3.

 m(3)
 For n = 3, set X = {1, 2, 3, 4, 5, 6, 7}, and C = {{1, 2, 4}, {2, 3, 5}, {3, 4, 6}, {4, 5, 7}, {5, 6, 1}, {6, 7, 2}, {7, 1, 3}} (the Steiner triple system S7); C does not have Property B (so m(3) <= 7), but if any element of C is omitted, then that element can be taken as Y, and the set of remaining elements C' will have Property B (so for this particular case, m(3) >= 7).  One may check all other collections of 6 3-sets to see that all have Property B.

 m(4)
 Östergård (2014) through an exhaustive search found m(4) = 23. Seymour (1974) constructed a hypergraph on 11 vertices with 23 edges without Property B, which shows that m(4) <= 23. Manning (1995) narrowed the floor such that m(4) >= 21.

Asymptotics of m(n) 
Erdős (1963) proved that for any collection of fewer than  sets of size n, there exists a 2-coloring in which all set are bichromatic. The proof is simple: Consider a random coloring. Therefore, there exists a good coloring.

Erdős (1964) showed the existence of an n-uniform hypergraph with  hyperedges which does not have property B (i.e., does not have a 2-coloring in which all hyperedges are bichromatic), establishing an upper bound. 

Schmidt (1963) proved that every collection of at most  sets of size n has property B. Erdős and Lovász conjectured that . They used a clever probabilistic algorithm.

See also

Set splitting problem

References

Further reading

.
.
.
.
.
.
.

Families of sets
Hypergraphs